The 1907 New York Highlanders season, the team's fifth, finished with the team in 5th place in the American League with a record of 70–78.  Another notable newcomer was New York's recently acquired left fielder Branch Rickey, who would become well known for integrating Jackie Robinson into the major leagues some four decades later.

Regular season

Season standings

Record vs. opponents

Roster

Player stats

Batting

Starters by position 
Note: Pos = Position; G = Games played; AB = At bats; H = Hits; Avg. = Batting average; HR = Home runs; RBI = Runs batted in

Other batters 
Note: G = Games played; AB = At bats; H = Hits; Avg. = Batting average; HR = Home runs; RBI = Runs batted in

Pitching

Starting pitchers 
Note: G = Games pitched; IP = Innings pitched; W = Wins; L = Losses; ERA = Earned run average; SO = Strikeouts

Other pitchers 
Note: G = Games pitched; IP = Innings pitched; W = Wins; L = Losses; ERA = Earned run average; SO = Strikeouts

Relief pitchers 
Note: G = Games pitched; W = Wins; L = Losses; SV = Saves; ERA = Earned run average; SO = Strikeouts

External links 
1907 New York Highlanders team page at www.baseball-almanac.com
1907 New York Highlanders at Baseball Reference

New York Yankees seasons
New York Highlanders
New York Highlanders
1900s in Manhattan
Washington Heights, Manhattan